Babikovo (Babik) is a rural locality (a village) in Kara-Yakupovsky Selsoviet, Chishminsky District, Bashkortostan, Russia. The population was 153 as of 2010. There are 2 streets.

Geography 
Babikovo is located 17 km southeast of Chishmy (the district's administrative centre) by road. Kara-Yakupovo is the nearest rural locality.

References 

Rural localities in Chishminsky District